The 2016 Mitre 10 Cup season was the eleventh season of New Zealand's provincial rugby union competition since it turned professional in 2006. The regular season began on August 18, when North Harbour hosted Counties Manukau. It involved the top fourteen rugby unions of New Zealand. For sponsorship reasons, the competition was known as the Mitre 10 Cup and it was the first season under the lead sponsor. The winner of the Championship, North Harbour was promoted to the Premiership, the seventh placed Premiership team, Hawke's Bay was relegated to the Championship.

Format
The Mitre 10 Cup standings were sorted by a competition points system. Four points were awarded to the winning team, a draw equaled two points, whilst a loss amounted to zero points. Unions could also win their side a respectable bonus point. To receive a bonus point, they must have scored four tries or more or lose by seven or fewer points or less. Each team was placed on their total points received. If necessary of a tiebreaker, when two or more teams finish on equal points, the union who defeated the other in a head-to-head got placed higher. In case of a draw between them, the side with the biggest points deferential margin got rights to be ranked above. If they were tied on points difference, it was then decided by a highest scored try count or a coin toss. This seeding format was implemented since the beginning of the 2006 competition.

The competition included a promotion-relegation process with the winner of the Championship receiving automatic promotion to the Premiership, replacing the seventh-placed team in the Premiership which was relegated to the Championship for the following year. The regular season consisted of two types of matches. The internal division matches were when each team played the other six unions in their division once, home or away. The cross-division matches were when each team played four teams from the other division, thus missing out on three teams, each from the opposite division. Each union played home or away games against teams from the other division, making a total of ten competition games for each union. The finals format allowed the top four teams from each division move on to the semi-finals. The top two division winners, based on table points, received a home semi-final. In the first round of the finals, the semi-finals, the second division winner hosted the third division winner, and the first division winner hosted the fourth division winner. The final was hosted by the top remaining seed.

Standings
Source: Mitre 10 Cup standings 2016

Standings progression

Regular season
The 2016 Mitre 10 Cup played across nine weeks with every team playing one Wednesday night fixture in a double-up round where they played twice that week. The competition started on Thursday, August 18, with North Harbour taking on Counties Manukau at QBE Stadium. Hawke's Bay hosted Wellington and Auckalnd versed Canterbury, in two repeat matchups of last year's finalists.

Week 1

Week 2

Week 3

Week 4

Week 5

Week 6

Week 7

Week 8

Week 9

Play-offs

Semi-finals

Finals

{| border="0" width="100%" 
|-
|

Statistics

Leading point scorers

Source: The weekly reviews of the matches published on provincial.rugby (see "Report" in the individual match scoring stats).

Leading try scorers

Source: The weekly reviews of the matches published on provincial.rugby (see "Report" in the individual match scoring stats).

Points by week

Source: Mitre 10 Cup Fixtures and Results 2016

Tries by week

Source: The weekly reviews of the matches published on provincial.rugby (see "Report" in the individual match scoring stats).

Sanctions

Ranfurly Shield

Pre-season challenges
After winning the Ranfurly Shield off Hawke's Bay in their final game of 2015, Waikato confirmed their pre-season defences against Thames Valley, King Country and Wanganui. The Thames Valley and King Country unions would take on Waikato for the fifth time, while Wanganui gained a mandatory shield challenge as the current holders of the Meads Cup. The first challenge for 2016 was against Thames Valley at the Paeroa Domain. King Country's challenge was played at Bedford Park in Matamata with Wanganui being the last pre-season challenge.

Waikato had little trouble getting a victory in their first shield defense of the season, winning 83–13 in Paeroa. They ran in thirteen tries in front of a 2,500 capacity crowd. Winger Iliesa Ratuva scored a hat-trick on debut for his province, while number 8 Whetu Douglas and prop Atunaisa Moli both got a brace. Thames Valley managed two second-half tries, the first after Waikato had reached fifty points to veteran Brett Ranga. Their second came when centre Jone Koroinsagana scored an intercept. The match also featured a return for former Ireland half-back Isaac Boss, who first played for the province in 1999 before heading to Ulster in 2005.

In their second defense, Waikato got past King Country 55–0 in Matamata. First scoring was lock Brian Alainu'uese, getting over after a series of pick and goes. Jordan Trainor then soon after added a penalty. Flanker Murray Iti scored his side's fifth, but there was no further scoring action until the 74th minute, when Sevu Reece, on as a substitute, crossed over in the far left corner. Matthew Lansdown, another substitute, then added Waikato's seventh with two minutes to play, and he was followed in the final minute by Tevita Taufu’i, who got their eighth.

References

External links

National Provincial Championship
2016 in New Zealand rugby union
Mitre